The Ax Billy Department Store, located in Eugene, Oregon, is listed on the National Register of Historic Places.  It is currently occupied by the Downtown Athletic Club.

See also
 National Register of Historic Places listings in Lane County, Oregon

References

1910 establishments in Oregon
Buildings and structures in Eugene, Oregon
National Register of Historic Places in Eugene, Oregon